The 1986 municipal election was held October 20, 1986 to elect a mayor and twelve aldermen to sit on Edmonton City Council, nine trustees to sit on the public school board, and seven trustees to sit on the separate school board.

Party labels were dropped from the ballots by this time.

This was the last election in which school trustees were elected at large.  Beginning in 1989, both districts introduced a ward system.

The fifty-seven candidates for the public school board remains the most in Edmonton's history.

Electoral system
Mayor was elected through First past the post.

Councillors were elected through Plurality block voting, two per ward, where each voter could cast up to two votes.

School board positions also were filled through Plurality block voting as well.

Voter turnout

There were 134020 ballots cast out of 396004 eligible voters, for a voter turnout of 33.8%.

Results

(bold indicates elected, italics indicate incumbent)

Mayor

Laurence Decore - 87939
Buck Olsen - 39857
Eddie Keehn - 1255
Naseer Chaudhary - 1037
Paul (Big Jim) Whitney - 704
Harold Real - 396

Aldermen

Ward 1

Bruce Campbell - 10929
Helen Paull - 10074
Dan Backs - 6545
Paul Norris - 5038
Walter Coombs - 2320
John Ludwig - 2104
Mary Hislop-Perraton - 864
Roxanne Herbert - 712
Francis Dryden - 490

Ward 2

Jan Reimer - 14177
Ron Hayter - 9733
Gene Romaniuk - 6297
Mike Fedoretz - 4181

Ward 3

Judy Bethel - 8779
Julian Kinisky - 7812
Joe Filewych - 4172
Bill Kostiniuk - 3888
John Strikwerda - 2994
Kathy Kellman - 1872
Mike Kachkar - 1309
John Lakusta - 1306

Ward 4

Lance White - 7639
Mel Binder - 6249
Donna Artuso - 4823
Alice Hanson - 4816
Gerry Wright - 4256
Ed Leger - 3579
Ron Pilling - 1609
Gordon Hum - 705
Carl Byrd Williams - 260

Ward 5

Lillian Staroszik - 12753
Patricia MacKenzie - 9052
Wes Candler - 8429
Donald Grimble - 5433
Ross Brown - 4278
Rom Smit - 875

Ward 6

Terry Cavanagh - 13990
Ken Kozak - 9977
Sheila McKay - 9809
Wayne Weeks - 4301
Ron Hodgins - 4077
John Bracegirdle - 2120
Eric Saemisch - 901
Bill Gowan-Smith - 566
Keith Adamson - 532

Public school trustees

Joan Cowling - 33370
Don Massey - 29323
Elaine Jones - 22878
Dick Mather - 17878
Lila Fahlman - 16613
Doug Tupper - 12216
George Luck - 12018
Leon Lubin - 11876
Don Williams - 11582
Linda Girard - 10337
Doug Elves - 10311
Adelle Bellhouse - 10213
Janice Drysdale - 9581
Clarence Climenhaga - 9493
John Lakusta - 9176
Gordon Hum - 9123
Jolly Drever - 8791
Gerry Beck - 8533
Marion Herbert - 8511
Rose Rosenberger - 8501
James Forbes - 8129
Yvonne Mury - 7524
Ninele Jackson - 7366
Bruce Uditsky - 7147
John Ludwig - 6985
Howard Welch - 6727
Joe Hak - 6523
Arnold Holmes - 6389
Olga Cyrulik - 6382
Ronald Bellamy - 6203
James Albers - 6024
Claire Fisher - 5825
Alex Kinasewich - 5687
Joe Burgis - 5246
Shona Wehm - 5092
Adolph Feingold - 5063
Norval Horner - 4948
R Glenn Ritchie - 4799
Don Cruse - 4767
Richard Woodward - 4478
Jack Broyles - 4202
Alwyn Brightley - 4182
Gurcharan Bhatia - 4010
David Rand - 3819
R Genis Bell - 3754
Gordon Stamp - 3516
Jeffrey Martin - 3492
Bas Roopnarine - 3363
Brian Morton - 3163
Doug Lewis - 3005
Jim Jacuta - 2982
Harbans Dhillon - 2911
Thomas Tomlinson - 2132
Samir Ghossein - 1690
Jack Thonger - 1622
Brant Maidens - 1304
A D Pirbhani - 1095

Separate (Catholic) school trustees

Catherine Chichak - 18108
Alice Gagne - 16267
Francis O'Hara - 15558
Hugh Tadman - 14191
Simone Demers-Secker - 9807
Ken Alyluia - 9628
Jim Shinkaruk - 8716
L Brian Mitchell - 8667
Lenore Hopchin - 8598
William Koehler - 7758
Carl Amodio - 7206
Joe Sell - 6606

References

External links

City of Edmonton: Edmonton Elections

1986
1986 elections in Canada
1986 in Alberta